Antarctic krill (Euphausia superba) is a species of krill found in the Antarctic waters of the Southern Ocean. It is a small, swimming crustacean that lives in large schools, called swarms, sometimes reaching densities of 10,000–30,000 individual animals per cubic metre. It feeds directly on minute phytoplankton, thereby using the primary production energy that the phytoplankton originally derived from the sun in order to sustain their pelagic (open ocean) life cycle. It is a key species in the Antarctic ecosystem and in terms of biomass, is one of the most abundant animal species on the planet (approximately 500 million tons, corresponding to 300 to 400 trillion individuals).

Life cycle

The main spawning season of Antarctic krill is from January to March, both above the continental shelf and also in the upper region of deep sea oceanic areas. In the typical way of all krill, the male attaches a spermatophore to the genital opening of the female. For this purpose, the first pleopods (legs attached to the abdomen) of the male are constructed as mating tools. Females lay 6,000–10,000 eggs at one time. They are fertilised as they pass out of the genital opening.

The egg hatches as a nauplius larva; once this has moulted into a metanauplius, the young animal starts migrating towards the surface in a migration known as developmental ascent.

The next two larval stages, termed second nauplius and metanauplius, still do not eat but are nourished by the remaining yolk. After three weeks, the young krill has finished the ascent. They can appear in enormous numbers counting 2 per litre in  water depth. Growing larger, additional larval stages follow (second and third calyptopis, first to sixth furcilia). They are characterised by increasing development of the additional legs, the compound eyes and the setae (bristles). At , the juvenile krill resembles the habitus of the adults. Krill reach maturity after two to three years. Like all crustaceans, krill must moult in order to grow. Approximately every 13 to 20 days, krill shed their chitinous exoskeleton and leave it behind as exuvia.

Food
The gut of E. superba can often be seen shining green through its transparent skin. This species feeds predominantly on phytoplankton—especially very small diatoms (20 μm), which it filters from the water with a feeding basket. The glass-like shells of the diatoms are cracked in the "gastric mill" and then digested in the hepatopancreas. The krill can also catch and eat copepods, amphipods and other small zooplankton. The gut forms a straight tube; its digestive efficiency is not very high and therefore a lot of carbon is still present in the feces. Antarctic krill (E. superba) primarily has chitinolytic enzymes in the stomach and mid-gut to break down chitinous spines on diatoms, additional enzymes can vary due to its expansive diet.

In aquaria, krill have been observed to eat each other. When they are not fed, they shrink in size after moulting, which is exceptional for animals this size. It is likely that this is an adaptation to the seasonality of their food supply, which is limited in the dark winter months under the ice. However, the animal's compound eyes do not shrink, and so the ratio between eye size and body length has thus been found to be a reliable indicator of starvation. A krill with ample food supply would have eyes proportional to body length, compared to a starving krill that would have eyes that appeared larger than what is normal.

Filter feeding
Antarctic krill directly ingest minute phytoplankton cells, which no other animal of krill size can do. This is accomplished through filter feeding, using the krill's highly developed front legs which form an efficient filtering apparatus: the six thoracopods (legs attached to the thorax) create a "feeding basket" used to collect phytoplankton from the open water. In the finest areas the openings in this basket are only 1 μm in diameter. In lower food concentrations, the feeding basket is pushed through the water for over half a metre in an opened position, and then the algae are combed to the mouth opening with special setae (bristles) on the inner side of the thoracopods.

Ice-algae raking
Antarctic krill can scrape off the green lawn of ice algae from the underside of pack ice. Krill have developed special rows of rake-like setae at the tips of their thoracopods, and graze the ice in a zig-zag fashion. One krill can clear an area of a square foot in about 10 minutes (1.5 cm2/s). Recent discoveries have found that the film of ice algae is well developed over vast areas, often containing much more carbon than the whole water column below. Krill find an extensive energy source here, especially in the spring after food sources have been limited during the winter months.

Biological pump and carbon sequestration

Krill are thought to undergo between one and three vertical migrations from mixed surface waters to depths of 100 m daily. The krill is a very untidy feeder, and it often spits out aggregates of phytoplankton (spit balls) containing thousands of cells sticking together. It also produces fecal strings that still contain significant amounts of carbon and, glass shells of the diatoms. Both are heavy and sink very fast into the abyss. This process is called the biological pump. As the waters around Antarctica are very deep, they act as a carbon dioxide sink: this process exports large quantities of carbon (fixed carbon dioxide, CO2) from the biosphere and sequesters it for about 1,000 years.

If the phytoplankton is consumed by other components of the pelagic ecosystem, most of the carbon remains in the upper layers of the ocean. There is speculation that this process is one of the largest biofeedback mechanisms of the planet, maybe the most sizable of all, driven by a gigantic biomass. Still more research is needed to quantify the Southern Ocean ecosystem.

Biology

Bioluminescence

Krill are often referred to as light-shrimp because they emit light through bioluminescent organs. These organs are located on various parts of the individual krill's body: one pair of organs at the eyestalk (cf. the image of the head above), another pair  are on the hips of the second and seventh thoracopods, and singular organs on the four pleonsternites. These light organs emit a yellow-green light periodically, for up to 2–3 s. They are considered so highly developed that they can be compared with a flashlight. There is a concave reflector in the back of the organ and a lens in the front that guide the light produced. The whole organ can be rotated by muscles, which can direct the light to a specific area. The function of these lights is not yet fully understood; some hypotheses have suggested they serve to compensate the krill's shadow so that they are not visible to predators from below; other speculations maintain that they play a significant role in mating or schooling at night.

The krill's bioluminescent organs contain several fluorescent substances. The major component has a maximum fluorescence at an excitation of 355 nm and emission of 510 nm.

Escape reaction
Krill use an escape reaction to evade predators, swimming backwards very quickly by flipping their rear ends. This swimming pattern is also known as lobstering. The trigger time to optical stimulus is, despite the low temperatures, only 55 ms.

Genome 
The genome of E. superba spans about 48 GB and is thus one of the largest in the animal kingdom and the largest that has been assembled to date. Its content of repetitive DNA is about 70% and may reach up to 92.45% after additional repeat annotation, which is also the largest fraction known of any genome. There is no evidence of polyploidy. Shao et al. annotated 28,834 protein-coding genes in the Antarctic krill genome, which is similar to other animal genomes. Notably, the gene and intron lengths of Antarctic krill are notably shorter than those of lungfishes and Mexican axolotl, two other animals with giant genomes.

Geographic distribution 

Antarctic krill has a circumpolar distribution, being found throughout the Southern Ocean, and as far north as the Antarctic Convergence. At the Antarctic Convergence, the cold Antarctic surface water submerges below the warmer subantarctic waters. This front runs roughly at 55° south; from there to the continent, the Southern Ocean covers 32 million square kilometres. This is 65 times the size of the North Sea. In the winter season, more than three-quarters of this area become covered by ice, whereas  become ice free in summer.

The waters of the Southern Ocean form a system of currents. Whenever there is a West Wind Drift, the surface strata travels around Antarctica in an easterly direction. Near the continent, the East Wind Drift runs counterclockwise. At the front between both, large eddies develop, for example, in the Weddell Sea. The krill swarms swim with these water masses, to establish one single stock all around Antarctica, with gene exchange over the whole area. Currently, there is little knowledge of the precise migration patterns since individual krill cannot yet be tagged to track their movements. The largest shoals are visible from space and can be tracked by satellite. Recent research suggests that krill do not simply drift passively in these currents but actually modify them. By moving vertically through the ocean on a 12-hour cycle, the swarms play a major part in mixing deeper, nutrient-rich water with nutrient-poor water at the surface.

Ecology
Antarctic krill is the keystone species of the Antarctic ecosystem beyond the coastal shelf, and provides an important food source for whales, seals (such as leopard seals, fur seals, and crabeater seals), squid, icefish, penguins, albatrosses and many other species of birds. Crabeater seals have even developed special teeth as an adaptation to catch this abundant food source: its unusual multilobed teeth enable this species to sieve krill from the water. Its dentition looks like a perfect strainer, but how it operates in detail is still unknown. Crabeaters are the most abundant seal in the world; 98% of their diet is made up of  E. superba. These seals consume over 63 million tonnes of krill each year. Leopard seals have developed similar teeth (45% krill in diet). All seals consume 63–130 million tonnes, all whales 34–43 million tonnes, birds 15–20 million tonnes, squid 30–100 million tonnes, and fish 10–20 million tonnes, adding up to 152–313 million tonnes of krill consumption each year.

The size step between krill and its prey is unusually large: generally it takes three or four steps from the 20 μm small phytoplankton cells to a krill-sized organism (via small copepods, large copepods, mysids to 5 cm fish). 

E. superba lives only in the Southern Ocean. In the North Atlantic, Meganyctiphanes norvegica and in the Pacific, Euphausia pacifica are the dominant species.

Biomass and production
The biomass of Antarctic krill was estimated in 2009 to be 0.05 gigatons of carbon (Gt C), similar to the total biomass of humans (0.06 Gt C). The reason Antarctic krill are able to build up such a high biomass and production is that the waters around the icy Antarctic continent harbour one of the largest plankton assemblages in the world, possibly the largest. The ocean is filled with phytoplankton; as the water rises from the depths to the light-flooded surface, it brings nutrients from all of the world's oceans back into the photic zone where they are once again available to living organisms.

Thus primary production—the conversion of sunlight into organic biomass, the foundation of the food chain—has an annual carbon fixation of 1–2 g/m2 in the open ocean. Close to the ice it can reach 30–50 g/m2. These values are not outstandingly high, compared to very productive areas like the North Sea or upwelling regions, but the area over which it takes place is enormous, even compared to other large primary producers such as rainforests. In addition, during the Austral summer there are many hours of daylight to fuel the process. All of these factors make the plankton and the krill a critical part of the planet's ecocycle.

Decline with shrinking pack ice

A possible decline in Antarctic krill biomass may have been caused by the reduction of the pack ice zone due to global warming. Antarctic krill, especially in the early stages of development, seem to need the pack ice structures in order to have a fair chance of survival. The pack ice provides natural cave-like features which the krill uses to evade their predators. In the years of low pack ice conditions the krill tend to give way to salps, a barrel-shaped free-floating filter feeder that also grazes on plankton.

Ocean acidification
Another challenge for Antarctic krill, as well as many calcifying organisms (corals, bivalve mussels, snails etc.), is the acidification of the oceans caused by increasing levels of carbon dioxide. Krill exoskeleton contains carbonate, which is susceptible to dissolution under low pH conditions. It has already been shown that increased carbon dioxide can disrupt the development of krill eggs and even prevent the juvenile krill from hatching, leading to future geographically widespread decreases in krill hatching success. The further effects of ocean acidification on the krill life cycle however remains unclear but scientists fear that it could significantly impact on its distribution, abundance and survival.

Fisheries

The fishery of Antarctic krill is on the order of 100,000 tonnes per year. The major catching nations are South Korea, Norway, Japan and Poland. The products are used as animal food and fish bait. Krill fisheries are difficult to operate in two important respects. First, a krill net needs to have very fine meshes, producing a very high drag, which generates a bow wave that deflects the krill to the sides. Second, fine meshes tend to clog very fast.

Yet another problem is bringing the krill catch on board. When the full net is hauled out of the water, the organisms compress each other, resulting in great loss of the krill's liquids. Experiments have been carried out to pump krill, while still in water, through a large tube on board. Special krill nets also are currently under development. The processing of the krill must be very rapid since the catch deteriorates within several hours. Its high protein and vitamin content makes krill quite suitable for both direct human consumption and the animal-feed industry.

Fishing and potentially overfishing krill is an issue of increasing concern.

References

Further reading

External links

 Krill Count Project
 Diary of the RRS James Clark Ross, giving a popular introduction to the Antarctic krill
 Euphausia superba from MarineBio
 A time to krill, Australian Antarctic Division
 Webcam of krill aquarium, Australian Antarctic Division
 Antarctic Krill fact sheet, Australian Antarctic Division

Krill
Fauna of Antarctica
Fauna of the Southern Ocean
Crustaceans described in 1850
Taxa named by James Dwight Dana
Spoken articles